Sometimes I Don't, But Sometimes I Do is the debut extended play by Canadian country music singer Tyler Joe Miller. It was released on November 6, 2020 through MDM Recordings. It includes the number-one singles "Pillow Talkin'" and "I Would Be Over Me Too", as well as the top-10 singles "Fighting", and "Sometimes I Do".

Track listing

Charts

Singles

Awards and nominations

Release history

References

2020 EPs
MDM Recordings albums